Peter Blangé (born 9 December 1964 in Voorburg, South Holland) is a retired volleyball player from the Netherlands, who represented his native country in four consecutive Summer Olympics, starting in 1988 in Seoul, South Korea.

In 1996 he won the gold medal in Atlanta, Georgia with the Dutch Men's National Team by defeating Italy in the final (3-2). He is currently the head coach of the Dutch Men's National Team.

References 
  Dutch Olympic Committee
  Volleyball News Letter

1964 births
Living people
Dutch men's volleyball players
Dutch volleyball coaches
Volleyball players at the 1988 Summer Olympics
Volleyball players at the 1992 Summer Olympics
Volleyball players at the 1996 Summer Olympics
Volleyball players at the 2000 Summer Olympics
Olympic volleyball players of the Netherlands
Olympic gold medalists for the Netherlands
Olympic silver medalists for the Netherlands
Sportspeople from Voorburg
Olympic medalists in volleyball
Medalists at the 1992 Summer Olympics
Medalists at the 1996 Summer Olympics
20th-century Dutch people
21st-century Dutch people